Santa Rosa del Peñón is a municipality in the León department of Nicaragua.

Municipalities of the León Department